The 68th Scripps National Spelling Bee was held on May 31 and June 1, 1995, at the Capital Hilton in Washington, D.C., sponsored by the E.W. Scripps Company.

Top contestants
14-year-old Justin Tyler Carroll from Wynne, Arkansas won the competition on June 1 by correctly spelling the word "xanthosis". Carroll was sponsored by Memphis, Tennessee Commercial Appeal as winner of the Mid-South Spelling Bee, where he beat a field of contestants from counties covering 5 states, excluding Shelby County, Tennessee. Carroll was the third ever winner from the Greater Memphis (Mid-South) area to win the national competition, following Irving Belz in the 1951 competition and Geoff Hooper in the 1993 competition. To advance to the national bee, the latter two had won the Memphis-Shelby County Spelling Bee, the other regional spelling bee sponsored by Commercial Appeal specifically for schools in Memphis and Shelby County, Tennessee. (As an aside, pop singer Justin Timberlake competed in the 1995 Memphis-Shelby County Spelling Bee.)

Marjory Lavery, a 13-year-old home schooler from Copley, Ohio, placed second after failing to correctly spell "cappelletti" in the 10th round. There was a three-way tie for third place between Jenelle Jindal, 13, of Princeton, New Jersey, Ryan M. Burke, 13, of Orange, Connecticut (who finished 21st the prior year), and 12-year-old Vauhini Vara of Edmond, Oklahoma.

Competition
The Bee had 247 contestants, the largest to date at that time. Contestants ranged from age 9 (three contestants) to 15, and including 45 repeat entrants. Sisters Wendy Guey (who finished 27th), age 11, and Emily Guey (who finished 59th), 13, were the first siblings to reach the same finals. Wendy would go on to win the Bee in her fourth consecutive competition the next year.

Thirty-eight spellers were eliminated on their opening words, which were drawn from the 1995 Paideia, a list of 3,000 words provided to the contestants, and the Additional Words section of the 1995 Regional Word List, also provided to the contestants. Beginning with Round 2, all words were drawn from Webster's Third New International Dictionary and its Addenda Section, copyright 1993. After the first day of competition, the number of spellers was reduced to 135. Once the field had been narrowed to 45 spellers in Round 5 on the second day of competition, ESPN2 aired the remainder of the bee live. A total of 835 words were used in the competition.

The competition was held at the Capital Hilton, where it had been held since 1980. The competition moved to the larger Grand Hyatt Washington the next year.

The 1994–95 school year was the first year the Paideia study list (which categorized words into themes such as "birds" and "musical instruments") was used in the local and national bees. Before then, the Words of the Champions study list (which categorized words alphabetically into three difficulty levels: "Beginning Words", "Intermediate Words", and "Advanced Words") had been used annually since 1950.

References

Scripps National Spelling Bee competitions
1995 in Washington, D.C.
1995 in education
May 1995 events in the United States
June 1995 events in the United States